The 2012 Stockport Metropolitan Borough Council election took place on 3 May 2012 to elect members of Stockport Metropolitan Borough Council in England. It was on the same day as other 2012 United Kingdom local elections.

The state of the parties after the election was:

Following the election, the Lib Dem minority administration was able to continue in office however the leader of the council, Dave Goddard, lost his seat to Labour by 45 votes, meaning that he was replaced by Sue Derbyshire.

Ward results
An asterisk denotes an incumbent.

Bramhall North ward

Bramhall South ward

Bredbury & Woodley ward

Bredbury Green & Romiley ward

Brinnington & Central ward

Cheadle & Gatley ward

Cheadle Hulme North ward

Chealde Hulme South ward

Davenport & Cale Green ward

Edgeley & Cheadle Heath ward

Hazel Grove ward

Heald Green ward

Heatons North ward

Heatons South ward

Manor ward

Marple North ward

Marple South ward

Offerton ward
Dave Goddard had been the leader of Stockport Council before he lost his seat in this election.
Laura Booth left Labour in 2014 and joined the Lib Dems in 2015. She was re-elected as the Lib Dem councillor for Offerton in 2016.

Reddish North ward

Reddish South ward

Stepping Hill ward

References

2012 English local elections
2012
2010s in Greater Manchester